Guyana competed at the 1992 Summer Olympics in Barcelona, Spain. A total of six athletes, five men and one woman, competed for the nation in three sports.

Competitors
The following is the list of number of competitors in the Games.

Athletic

Men's Long Jump
Mark Mason
 Qualification — 7.83 m (→ did not advance)

Women's High Jump
 Najuma Fletcher
 Qualification — 1.79 m (→ did not advance)

Boxing

Cycling

One male cyclist represented Guyana in 1992.

Men's road race
 Aubrey Richmond

Men's points race
 Aubrey Richmond

See also
Guyana at the 1991 Pan American Games

References

External links
Official Olympic Reports

Nations at the 1992 Summer Olympics
1992
Olympics